Festival dance is a form of Irish dance traditionally associated with Northern Ireland. It separated from the "feis" movement in stepdancing in the mid-20th century and became stylistically and administratively distinct. The form is practised competitively in Northern Ireland, England, and parts of mainland Europe.

History 
In the early 20th century, the Gaelic League, an organisation devoted to the promotion of the Irish language in Ireland, established An Coimisiún Le Rincí Gaelacha (CLRG) to standardise and promote traditional Irish dance, as part of a broader Irish nationalist cause. However, the organisation was criticised for its emphasis on certain regional styles and traditions at the expense of others.

In 1951 dance teacher Patricia Mulholland was suspended from teaching by CLRG for six months after participating in a dance event where the British national anthem was played. Mulholland decided to leave CLRG and create a new form of Irish dance, described as a form of "folk ballet", in order to appeal to Protestant and Catholic heritages.

A group of dancing teachers from Northern Ireland met in Belfast in 1971 and formed a new organisation, initially known as An Comgall, but later renamed to the Nine Glens Association. The Association hosted various annual competitions, and became the Festival Dance Teachers Association in 2003.

Style 
There are stylistic differences between festival dance and modern stepdance as the predominating forms of solo Irish dance. Teachers of festival dance emphasise the importance of individualism in performance, and encourage storytelling in the interpretations of each dancer. It is described as less rigid, and proponents highlight the "art and personal expression" involved. Set dances, which are standardised by An Coimisiún and other stepdance organisations, are originally composed for individual festival dancers.

In competition, festival dancers depart from the highly embellished costumes that became prominent in An Coimisiún competitions after the debut of Riverdance at the 1994 Eurovision Song Contest. Competitors do not wear wigs, and makeup and fake tan are frequently prohibited. Costumes for girls are typically free-flowing velvet dresses, which create a perception of fluid movement in the style of the dance. Hard shoes are worn which resemble those of stepdancers, but ghillies (soft shoes) are made of canvas and are closer in construction to ballet slippers.

Organisation 
The Festival Dance Teachers Association (FDTA) promotes and coordinates Irish festival dance, predominantly in Northern Ireland. The FDTA describes the Ulster Championships as its most significant competition. Competitions are held for both solo and team dances.

The Festival Irish Dance Teachers Association (F.I.D.T,A.) promotes and teaches Festival Irish Dancing in Somerset, U.K. The Association was formed by Catherine Bartlett in 2000. They have welcomed schools from Northern Ireland to their Irish Dance competitions in Somerset alongside other styles and Associations. They have hosted The European Championship giving dancers from Northern Ireland the opportunity to compete against the rest of the world whilst maintaining Festival style and traditions.

Notes

References 

Irish dance